Diane Swanson (born 5 April 1944, died 19 Nov 2021) was a Canadian writer of science books for children.

Biography
Swanson was born and raised in Lethbridge, Alberta. As a child, she and her terrier Sammy would spend summers looking for ladybugs and spiders outside.

She graduated from the University of Alberta with an Honours Bachelor of Arts in the social sciences. 
She taught in the West Indies for two years.  She researched water resources for the Canadian government while living in Ottawa.

Swanson's first book was published when she was 18. She has written over 70 books and 450 magazine articles.

Swanson lived in Victoria, British Columbia. Her hobbies were hiking, piano-playing, and reading.  She was married with two children.

Reception

The Toronto Globe and Mail described Swanson's A Crash of Rhinos, A Party of Jays as providing "a cheerfully educational vantage point from which to view the natural world and its denizens".  Booklist called it "part science and part English lesson", deeming it "great for individual or classroom consumption".

The Globe and Mail called The Wonder in Water a "well-laid-out and attractively illustrated book".

Nzong Xiong, writing for The Fresno Bee, described The Dentist & You as an "easy-to-read" book designed to help make dentist visits for children ages 4 to 7 "easier and less fearful". Resource Links found it to be useful for "parents wanting to prepare their children for their first visit to the dentist" or teachers, but found the book "a bit too long and detailed" for the target audience. School Library Journal, however, tagged it as "excellent in relation to other titles on the same subject".

Buffalo Sunrise was called "a full-bodied photo essay" and an "exemplary book" that "ably" recounts the history of the American buffalo by the San Francisco Chronicle.  Booklist called it "a useful resource for middle-graders".

Reviewing Alligators and Crocodiles, Frogs and Toads and Penguins from the Welcome to the World of Animals series for the School Library Journal, Arwen Marshall of the Minneapolis Public Library criticized the narrow scope of the books, saying "These serviceable overviews might be useful for brief reports, but they don't cover any new ground." Resource Links found the series to provide "enough information to satisfy [students'] curiosity while also meeting their research needs", recommending the books "for any elementary school library".

Published works

Animals Can Be So ... series

Canada Close Up series

Mysterious You series

Nature Detectives — The Living World series

True Stories from the Edge series

Up Close series

Welcome to the World series

Other books
Authored

Co-authored

Awards

Bugs Up Close
-Finalist, Silver Birch Express Award, 2009
-Finalist, Children's Literature Roundtables of Canada  Information Book Award, 2008

The Wonder in Water - shortlisted for the Silver Birch Award, 2006/07

Turn It Loose - shortlisted for the 2006/07 Red Cedar Award

Tunnels! True stories from the edge, Winner of the Hackmatack Award, 2004–05

Nibbling on Einstein's Brain
- Short-listed, B.C. Red Cedar Book Award, 2003/2004
- White Raven, International Youth Library, Munich, 2002
- Nonfiction Honor List, Voice of Youth Advocates (VOYA), American Library Association, 2002
- Notables 2002, Canadian Library Association
- Short-listed, Science in Society Award, 2002
- Los Angeles' 100 Best Books, 2001

Hmm? (Kids Can Press, 2001, illustrated by Rose Cowles)
- Short-listed, B.C. Red Cedar Book Award, 2003/2004 - Short-listed, Utah Children's Informational Book Award, 2002–03
- Short-listed, Ontario Silver Birch Award, 2002
- Winner, Informal Education Product of the Year Award for Linguistic Intelligence, 2002

Burp! (Kids Can Press, 2001, illustrated by Rose Cowles)
- Notables 2002, Canadian Library Association
- Children's Choices for 2002, International Reading Association and Children's Book Council
- Short-listed, Children's Literature Roundtables of Canada  Information Book Award, 2002
- Short-listed, Rocky Mountain Award, 2002–03
- Short-listed, Atlantic Provinces Hackmatack Award, 2002–03
- Winner, Informal Education Product of the Year Award for Linguistic Intelligence, 2002

Up Close: Skin That Slimes and Scares, (Greystone  Books, 2001)
- Short-listed, B.C. Red Cedar Book Award, 2003/2004

Animals Eat the Weirdest Things (Whitecap Books & Henry Holt, 1998, illus. by Terry Smith)
- Short-listed, Rocky Mountain Book Award, 2001

Welcome to the World of Rabbits and Hares, 2000 Our Choice, Canadian Children's Book Centre
Welcome to the World of Octopuses, 2000 Our Choice, Canadian Children's Book Centre
Feet That Suck and Feed, 2000 Our Choice, Canadian Children's Book Centre
Teeth That Stab and Grind, 2000 Our Choice, Canadian Children's Book Centre

Orbis Pictus Award for Outstanding Nonfiction for Children, 1995, for Safari Beneath the Sea

Animals Eat the Weirdest Things (Whitecap Books & Henry Holt, 1998, illus. by Terry Smith)
 Our Choice, Canadian Children's Book Centre
 Short-listed, B.C. Red Cedar Book Award, 2000/2001
 Short-listed, Mr. Christie's Book Award, 1999
 Short-listed, Ontario Silver Birch Award, 1999
 Short-listed, Children's Literature Roundtables of Canada Information Book Award, 1999

Bug Bites (Whitecap Books, 1997, illustrated by the Royal British Columbia Museum)
 Our Choice, Canadian Children's Book Centre
 Short-listed, B.C. Red Cedar Book Award, 1999/2000
 Short-listed, Children's Literature Roundtables of Canada Information Book Award, 1998
 Short-listed, Ontario Silver Birch Award, 1998

Buffalo Sunrise (Whitecap Books and Sierra Club Books for Children, 1996)
 Our Choice, Canadian Children's Book Centre
 Short-listed, International Reading Association's Young Adult Choice Award, 1998
 Short-listed, Ontario Silver Birch Award, 1997

The Day of the Twelve-Story Wave (Whitecap Books/Longstreet Press, 1995, illus. by Laura Cook)
 Our Choice, Canadian Children's Book Centre

Sky Dancers (Whitecap Books and Voyageur Press, 1995, illustrated by Doug Penhale)
 Our Choice, Canadian Children's Book Centre
 Short-listed, B.C. Red Cedar Book Award, 1997/98

Safari Beneath the Sea (Whitecap Books & Sierra Club Books for Children, 1994, photography by the Royal British Columbia Museum)
 Winner, Orbis Pictus Award for Outstanding Nonfiction for Children (USA), 1995
 American Library Association Recommended Book for Reluctant Young Adult Readers
 Our Choice, Canadian Children's Book Centre
 Short-listed, Garden State (New Jersey) Children's Book Award, 1997
 Short-listed, Children's Literature Roundtables of Canada Information Book Award, 1995
 Short-listed, Utah Children's Informational Book Award, 1995–96

Coyotes in the Crosswalk (Whitecap Books, 1994 and Voyageur Press, 1995, illustrated by Doug Penhale); French edition: Attention! Coyote Au Carrefour (Heritage jeunesse, 1995)
 Our Choice, Canadian Children's Book Centre
 Short-listed, Ontario Silver Birch Award, 1996
 Short-listed, Children's Literature Roundtables of Canada Information Book Award, 1995

Squirts and Snails and Skinny Green Tails (Whitecap Books, 1993, 1997 and Bob Adams, 1994, illustrated by Warren Clark); French edition: Coquilles, Coquillages Et Tresors De La Plage (Heritage jeunesse, 1995)
 Our Choice, Canadian Children's Book Centre

The Emerald Sea (Whitecap Books and Alaska Northwest Books, 1993, photography by Dale Sanders)
 Short-listed for the Bill Duthie Booksellers' Choice, B.C. Book Prizes, 1994

Why Seals Blow Their Noses (Whitecap Books, 1992, 1993, 1995, 1997 and Voyageur Press, 1994, illustrated by Doug Penhale); French edition: Pourquoi Les Phoques Ont-Ils Un Ballon Sur Le Nez? (Heritage jeunesse, 1995)
 Winner, Best Illustrated Book, One Color, Mid-America Publishers Association Awards, 1995
 Short-listed, Children's Literature Roundtables of Canada Information Book Award, 1993
 Our Choice, Canadian Children's Book Centre
 Book-of-the-Month Club Selection

A Toothy Tongue and One Long Foot (Whitecap Books, 1992, 1993 and Bob Adams, 1994, illustrated by Warren Clark and Carolyn Swanson)
 Our Choice, Canadian Children's Book Centre

Welcome to the World series (Whitecap Books)
Welcome to the World of Porcupines, 1999
 Our Choice, Canadian Children's Book Centre
 B.C. 2000 Book Award
Welcome to the World of Skunks, 1999
 Our Choice, Canadian Children's Book Centre
 B.C. 2000 Book Award
Welcome to the World of Beavers, 1999
 Our Choice, Canadian Children's Book Centre
 B.C. 2000 Book Award
Welcome to the World of Moose, 1999
 Our Choice, Canadian Children's Book Centre
 B.C. 2000 Book Award
Welcome to the World of Bats, 1998
 Our Choice, Canadian Children's Book Centre
Welcome to the World of Raccoons, 1998
 Our Choice, Canadian Children's Book Centre
Welcome to the World of Foxes, 1998
 Our Choice, Canadian Children's Book Centre
Welcome to the World of Eagles, 1998
 Our Choice, Canadian Children's Book Centre
Welcome to the World of Owls, 1997
 Our Choice, Canadian Children's Book Centre
Welcome to the World of Wild Cats, 1997
 Our Choice, Canadian Children's Book Centre
Welcome to the World of Bears, 1997
 Our Choice, Canadian Children's Book Centre
 Winner of a Parents' Choice Award, US, 1998
Welcome to the World of Otters, 1997
 Our Choice, Canadian Children's Book Centre
 Winner of a Parents' Choice Award, US, 1998
Welcome to the World of Wolves, 1996
 Our Choice, Canadian Children's Book Centre
 Book-of-the-Month Club Selection
Welcome to the World of Whales, 1996
 Our Choice, Canadian Children's Book Centre
 Book-of-the-Month Club Selection

Other memberships
CWILL B.C.
Canadian Children's Book Centre

References

External links

 About Diane Swanson at JacketFlap
 

1944 births
Canadian children's writers
Canadian nature writers
Canadian women non-fiction writers
Children's non-fiction writers
Writers from Lethbridge
Writers from Victoria, British Columbia
Living people
Canadian women children's writers
Women science writers